Wolfgang Gerhardt (born 31 December 1943) is a German politician and was the leader of the Free Democratic Party of Germany (FDP) from 1995 until he was succeeded by Guido Westerwelle in 2001.

Political career
Gerhardt was born in Ulrichstein. He was a member of the Member of the Landtag of Hesse from 1978 until 1994. Between 1987 and 1991, he served as State Minister for Science and Culture and Deputy Minister-President in the state government of Minister-President Walter Wallmann of Hesse. In this capacity, he was one of the state's representatives on the Bundesrat.

From 2002 until 2012, Gerhardt was Vice President of Liberal International (LI), under the leadership of successive presidents Annemie Neyts-Uyttebroeck (2002–2005), John Alderdice (2005–2009), and Hans van Baalen (2009–2011).

Ahead of the 2005 national elections, Gerhard was billed as a possible foreign minister in a new centre-right coalition with the Christian Democrats; instead, newly elected Chancellor Angela Merkel entered a coalition with the Social Democratic Party. Gerhardt was succeeded as chairman of the FDP parliamentary group by Westerwelle in 2006. Between 2006 and 2013, he served on the Committee on Foreign Affairs.

Since 2006, Gerhardt has been serving as chairman of the board of the Friedrich Naumann Foundation.

Other activities

Corporate boards
 Alte Leipziger Lebensversicherung aG, Member of the Advisory Board
 Hallesche-Nationale Krankenversicherung aG, Member of the Advisory Board
 Rücker AG, Member of the Supervisory Board
 Deutsche Vermögensberatung (DVAG), Member of the Advisory Board (1995)

Non-profits
 Theodor Heuss House, Chairman of the Board of Trustees
 Max Planck Institute for Heart and Lung Research, Member of the Board of Trustees
 German Association for Small and Medium-Sized Businesses (BVMW), Member of the Political Advisory Board
 Memorial to the Murdered Jews of Europe, Member of the Advisory Board
 German Institute for International and Security Affairs (SWP), Member of the Council (2005–2013)
 Turkey: Culture of Change Initiative (TCCI), Member of the Advisory Board

Personal life
Gerhardt is married and has two children.

References

1943 births
Living people
Members of the Bundestag for Hesse
Members of the Bundestag 2009–2013
Members of the Bundestag 2005–2009
Members of the Bundestag 2002–2005
Members of the Bundestag 1998–2002
Members of the Bundestag 1994–1998
Members of the Bundestag for the Free Democratic Party (Germany)